Bhoyari, also known as Bhoyari Pawari, is an Indo-Aryan dialect of Central India. It is spoken by the Bhoyar  social group in Betul, Chhindwara, and Wardha districts.

See also 
 Rajasthani Language

References 

Languages of India
Indo-Aryan languages